HM Prison Noranside (24 miles North of Dundee off the A90)  was a low-security prison, located in Noranside, Scotland. The prison was managed by the Scottish Prison Service. It had a design capacity of up to 140 prisoners. surprisingly a small number for the size of the prison. It was merged with HMP Castle Huntly on 30 October 2011.

References 

Defunct prisons in Scotland
Buildings and structures in Angus, Scotland